Charlotte Harbor is a census-designated place (CDP) in Charlotte County, Florida, United States.

The population of Charlotte Harbor was 3,710 at the 2010 census. It is part of the Sarasota-Bradenton-Punta Gorda Combined Statistical Area.

Geography
Charlotte Harbor is located at  (26.963897, -82.062267) on the north bank of the Peace River, the main tidal inlet to the Charlotte Harbor estuary, itself an arm of the Gulf of Mexico. U.S. Route 41, the Tamiami Trail, crosses the Peace River between Charlotte Harbor and Punta Gorda via the Barron Collier Bridge (northbound) and the Gilchrist Bridge (southbound).

Demographics

Notable event
On August 13, 2004, Hurricane Charley first made mainland landfall at the mouth of Charlotte Harbor.

References

External links

 Charlotte Harbor Watershed - Florida DEP
 Charlotte Harbor Water Atlas

Unincorporated communities in Charlotte County, Florida
Census-designated places in Charlotte County, Florida
Census-designated places in Florida
Unincorporated communities in Florida
Populated places on Charlotte Harbor
Former municipalities in Florida